Germacrene C synthase (EC 4.2.3.60) is an enzyme with systematic name (2E,6E)-farnesyl-diphosphate diphosphate-lyase (germacrene-C-forming). This enzyme catalyses the following chemical reaction

 (2E,6E)-farnesyl diphosphate  germacrene C + diphosphate

References

External links 
 

EC 4.2.3